Miguel Ángel Rodríguez Echeverría (born 9 January 1940) is a Costa Rican economist, lawyer, businessman and politician who served as President of Costa Rica from 1998 to 2002. He was minister of planning from 1968 to 1970 and minister of the presidency in 1970 during the administration of Jose Joaquin Trejos Fernandez (1966 - 1970); member of the board of the Costa Rican Central Bank from 1966 to 1969; congressman from 1990 to 1993, serving as president of the Legislative Assembly during the 1991 to 1992 period; and was elected Secretary General of the Organization of American States (OAS) in 2004. He voluntarily stepped down from this post to return to his country to face allegations of financial wrongdoing during his presidential tenure in Costa Rica. On April 27 of 2011 he was sentenced to 5 years in prison, but this ruling was later reversed in a December 2012 decision by an appeals court, which found him innocent of all charges.

Rodríguez came to the presidency as the candidate of the social Christian party (Partido Unidad Social Cristiana) with an agenda that included the opening of state-run monopolies in insurance and telecommunications, the rationalization of the public sector including increasing the role of the private sector in public infrastructure, trade liberalization, and the expansion and modernization of the social welfare system. The reforms of the insurance and telecom sectors generated massive protests and were subsequently abandoned, but were later implemented when Costa Rica became part of the DR-CAFTA (Dominican Republic-Central America Free Trade Agreement) in 2009.

Early life
Rodríguez was born in San José. At the University of Costa Rica he obtained degrees in both economics (1962) and law (1963) and worked there briefly as an assistant professor of economics. He then attended the University of California, Berkeley in the United States, where he received both M.A. and PhD degrees in economics in 1966, having completed a thesis on monetary policy. Immediately after graduating he returned to Costa Rica to serve as Minister of Planning and member of the board of directors of the Costa Rican Central Bank, during the government of president José Joaquín Trejos.

In the 1970s and 1980s Rodríguez combined academic work as a professor of economics at the University of Costa Rica and at the Autonomous University of Central America with a business venture in cattle holding: Grupo Ganadero Industrial, S.A.

Rodriguez is also a devout Roman Catholic. His brother, Álvaro Rodríguez, currently serves as Superior General of the De La Salle Brothers.

Political career
Rodríguez was the President of the Legislative Assembly of Costa Rica from 1991 to 1992. Rodríguez ran three times for president. In 1990 he lost his party's nomination to Rafael Ángel Calderón. In 1994 he won his party's nomination but lost the election to José María Figueres. He finally secured the presidency in 1998. In spite of his experience as an economist and businessman, his presidency was generally regarded as ineffectual. Proposed free-market reforms, including a plan to end the state monopoly on telecommunications, fell apart under opposition from the trade unions of government employees and other groups, but he was successful in reforming the retirement system and opening it to private participation as well as giving in concession to a private company the operation of the main port in the Pacific Ocean (Caldera).  After his term of office, Rodríguez worked as a consultant at Manatt Jones Global Strategies and as a visiting professor at George Washington University in Washington, D.C.

Political views 

Rodriguez is widely considered a believer in free enterprise and a pro-market politician, who favors market reforms and the opening of the economy to foreign investment.

He is also considered a social conservative. In 1998 Rodriguez incensed people in the gay community, by opposing a gay/lesbian festival in a beach resort in Quepos, in the central Pacific region of Costa Rica. Rodriguez, at the time the president of Costa Rica, was quoted in the press as saying "It is important that the appropriate authorities not grant any permits for any type of public activities associated with the gay/lesbian festival". His position was echoed by Mons. Roman Arrieta, Archbishop of San Jose, and Father Minor de Jesús Calvo, a conservative priest that had at the time a program in TV. Francisco Madrigal, the director of Triangulo Rosa, a gay/lesbian organization filed a complaint in the Costa Rican Supreme Court's complaints division against Msgr. Román Arrieta Villalobos, the Archbishop of San José, and Father Minor de Jesús Calvo. Triángulo Rosa also registered a complaint with the Defensoría de los Habitantes, the government's ombudsmen organization, against the President of Costa Rica, Dr. Miguel Ángel Rodríguez Gay organization fights discrimination.

Secretary-General of the Organization of American States
On 7 June 2004 he was unanimously elected to replace César Gaviria as secretary general of the OAS. He began his term on 15 September 2004 but served only 1 month, before stepping down when a former political collaborator accused him of having accepted a kickback from the French telecommunications firm Alcatel, which had been awarded a large government contract for cellular phone bandwidth during Rodríguez's tenure as president.

On 8 October 2004, Rodríguez resigned as OAS Secretary General, effective 15 October, and was replaced by Assistant Secretary General Luigi Einaudi, a former U.S. State Department official who assumed the title of Acting Secretary General. After resigning from his post, Rodríguez returned to Costa Rica on 15 October 2004 and was placed first under house arrest and two weeks later in jail, pending further investigations.

Accusations of involvement in corruption scandals

Political contributions from Carlos Hank 

In 1997, while Rodríguez was a candidate for the Presidency of Costa Rica, he met Carlos Hank González, a Mexican politician and rich businessman. He reportedly accepted campaign contributions from Hank, which is forbidden by Costa Rican law. The international media made allegations of these illegal payments. Most of the articles hinted that Hank had ties with organized crime. Rodríguez denied any wrongdoing. He did not face charges.

Payments from Taiwan
News reports claimed that Rodríguez had also received $1.4 million from the government of Taiwan. This amount was deposited in Panama in an account controlled by the firm Inversiones Denisse S.A., a consulting firm that allegedly belonged to Rodríguez. His lawyers claim that Rodríguez was no longer the owner of Inversiones Denisse when the payments took place. The motivation for the Taiwanese government payments is unknown. Taiwanese officials, however, have recognized that their cooperation with allies led to corruption in some cases. President Ma Ying-jeou promised to end what he called "the diplomacy of the cheque book." In 2007 Oscar Arias recognizing China's economic growth ended Costa Rica recognition of Taiwan Costa-Rica switches allegiance to china.

Payments from reinsurers
On 22 October 2010, the British media reported that Julian Messent, a former executive in the reinsurance firm PWS (owned by Lord Pearson), had pleaded guilty in Southwark Crown Court to paying £ 1.2 million in bribes to three Costa Rican officials, in exchange for a contract with the state insurance monopoly, the Instituto Nacional de Seguros (INS). The money was disbursed in 41 payments, over the period from 1999 to 2002. Messent was sentenced to serve 21 months in jail. According to the sentence, Mr. Messent should pay a fine of US$160,000 to the Costa Rican state. https://web.archive.org/web/20101029212335/http://www.nacion.com/2010-10-26/ElPais/UltimaHora/ElPais2568554.aspx The Costa Rican media suggested that the unnamed officials might be Rodríguez, former INS director Cristóbal Zawadski, and former director of the INS's reinsurance department Álvaro Acuña Prado.

Rodríguez, Zawadski, Prado, and several others were already under investigation in Costa Rica after it had been revealed that PWS had transferred at least $200,000 to Inversiones Denisse, a Panamanian firm owned by Rodríguez. PWS allegedly inflated the policies of the Instituto Costarricense de Electricidad (ICE) in order to create a discretionary fund of $1.6 million. The director of ICE at the moment that this operation took place was Rafael Sequeira, father-in-law of Rodríguez's son. The other reinsurer that made payments to the company of Rodríguez was the firm Guy Carpenter Reinmex, based in Mexico.

On 30 July 2013, The Prosecutor's Office requested the opening of a judicial investigation of alleged embezzlement charges against Miguel Ángel Rodríguez, according to the weekly newspaper The Tico Times. The investigation also includes the president of the National Insurance Institute (INS) Cristóbal Zawadzki Wojtasiak and Álvaro Acuña Prado, a department manager at INS. Reportedly, Rodriguez dismissed the charges in a press release, stating that these charges are a gross persecution against him, and that he will fight the allegations in courts. He also mentioned that the Prosecutor Office had already decided to dismissed the charges in 2005.

ICE-Alcatel scandal
Rodríguez was tried in Costa Rica for allegedly receiving more than US$800,000 in payments from Alcatel, a French telecommunications company, in exchange for helping the company receive a government contract to provide 400,000 cell phone lines. In 2007, Christian Sapsizian, a former adjunct to the vice president of Alcatel for Latin America, pleaded guilty in the U.S. District Court of Miami to violating the Foreign Corrupt Practices Act by conspiring with Edgar Valverde (the president of Alcatel in Costa Rica) to bribe an "official" of the Costa Rican Institute of Electricity (ICE) and a "senior government official" of Costa Rica. Mr. Sapsizian was sentenced to 30 months in prison, three years of supervised release, and forfeiture of $261,500.

The prosecution in Costa Rica alleges that the "senior government official" was President Rodríguez, and that the ICE official was José Antonio Lobo, who has agreed to testify against Rodríguez in exchange for immunity from prosecution. Valverde, Rodríguez, and seven other people were tried in Costa Rica for their alleged involvement in the kickback scheme. After long delays, the trial began in April 2010. The trial took many months, because 110 witnesses appeared before the judges. On 28 April 2011, Rodríguez Echeverría was sentenced to 5 years in prison for his participation in the kickback scheme. Moreover, he will not be able to serve in public office during 12 years. Miguel Angel Rodríguez sentenced to five years in prison-Spanish. The other defendants were also found guilty and received sentences ranging from two to 15 years of prison Three defendants will go directly to prison.

In 2010 Alcatel-Lucent agreed to pay a fine of US$137.4 million to avoid US prosecution for alleged bribes paid in several countries, including Kenya, Taiwan and Costa Rica. In a separate deal with Costa Rican government, Alcatel-Lucent also agreed to pay a fine of US$10 million. The agreement with the Procuraduría General de la República, the legal representative of the Costa Rican state, is intended to compensate for the social damage brought about by the kickback scheme. Originally, the Procuraduria had demand a compensation of US$60 million. Reportedly, the Procuraduría will also pursue compensation from other people currently on trial. The compensation sought amounts to US$52 million.

In July 2015 it was reported in the international media that Alcatel-Lucent (name of the company after a merger with Lucent Technologies) had agreed to make an additional payment of US$10 million to the Costa Rican government. According to these reports, discussions on the settlement have been dragging on for years. However, on 8 June 2015 Alcatel agreed with the Instituto Costarricense de Electricidad (ICE) to pay to the latter US$10 million to settle the question. It has also been reported that Alcatel-Lucent has budgeted US$52 million to pay for civil action concerning legal prosecution of its former managers in the country. Alcatel Luct pays 10 million to Costa Rica's ICE over old bribery scandal

Sentence
On 27 April 2011 he was sentenced to 5 years in prison.  In 2012 the sentence was revoked amid accusation of prosecutor misconduct. The appellation tribunal found that Lobo, the crown's prosecution witness was not only given immunity (even as from his own declaration he was the mastermind of the transactions) but was allowed to keep the money he obtain from the illegal transactions (an amount more than 3 times that of Rodriguez). Lobo also changed versions more than 7 times and the appellation tribunal found unusual that Rodriguez was accused using one version on the events but condemn using a different version, harming his ability to mount an effective defense.

References

|-

External links
 OAS website: Brief biography
 Biography by CIDOB (in Spanish)
 

1940 births
Living people
University of Costa Rica alumni
UC Berkeley College of Letters and Science alumni
Academic staff of the University of Costa Rica
Presidents of Costa Rica
Costa Rican economists
Costa Rican Roman Catholics
People from San José, Costa Rica
Presidents of the Legislative Assembly of Costa Rica
Social Christian Unity Party politicians
Secretaries General of the Organization of American States
Costa Rican politicians convicted of crimes
Heads of government who were later imprisoned
Costa Rican expatriates in the United States
Recipients of the Medal of the Oriental Republic of Uruguay